Estadio de Monteria is a stadium in Montería, Colombia that is under construction. It will host the opening and closing ceremonies of the Juegos Nacionales (National Games of Columbia).  It will have a seating capacity of 42,000 spectators.

References

Football venues in Colombia
Stadiums under construction
Buildings and structures in Córdoba Department
Montería